Thebarton was an electoral district of the House of Assembly in the Australian state of South Australia from 1938 to 1956.
It was abolished and replaced by the seat of West Torrens for the 1956 election.

Members

Election results

References 

Former electoral districts of South Australia
1938 establishments in Australia
1956 disestablishments in Australia